Senator Forbes may refer to:

Malcolm Forbes (1919–1990), New Jersey State Senate
Randy Forbes (born 1952), Virginia State Senate